The 1990 Connecticut gubernatorial election included a three-way race for a seat left open when Governor William A. O'Neill declined to run for re-election. A Connecticut Party nominee Lowell Weicker narrowly won the election, becoming the first candidate who was not a member of one of the two major parties to win a gubernatorial election since the 1974 election in Maine.

Background

1990 marked the end of an era in Connecticut politics in many ways. Governor O'Neill announced that he would not seek a third term in office, endangering Democrats' control of the governor's mansion that had begun sixteen years earlier with the election of Ella Grasso. Commonly remembered as a "popular" governor, O'Neill benefited by the late 1980s from an improving job market and popular reception of his extensive infrastructure renovation projects. O'Neill's collaboration with a friendly legislature, which was recaptured by the Democrats in 1986 and has not shifted to Republican control to this day, meant a more active and expansive government and a slow worsening of the state's finances. Moreover, change was in the air - 1989 municipal elections saw dozens of incumbent mayors and selectmen thrown out, regardless of their party. The coalition of middle-class voters from small towns, ethnic and racial minorities and highly educated liberals that Democrats had built into a thirty-year rule of the state looked to be cracking at the seams.

General election

Candidates
Bruce Morrison, U.S. Representative from Centerville (Democratic)
John G. Rowland, U.S. Representative from Waterbury (Republican)
Lowell Weicker, former Republican U.S. Senator (A Connecticut Party)
Joseph Zdonczyk (Concerned Citizens)

Campaign
Lowell Weicker, the liberal Republican and former US Senator who lost his seat to Joseph Lieberman in 1988, announced the formation of a new party (named "A Connecticut Party" so as to appear at the top of the alphabetically listed ballot) with an inchoate political organization intended solely to elect Weicker as Governor. The Republicans and Democrats were thus faced with an immense political challenge - nominating candidates to defeat a popular, fluidly partisan Connecticut political veteran possessing the ability to draw votes from both sides of the aisle. The late timing of Weicker's announcement (late July) meant that Connecticut's heavy-hitting Democrats had no time to form coherent campaigns and thus stayed out of the race, leaving Democrats to choose Congressman Bruce Morrison to run in November. Morrison suffered from poor name recognition outside his home of New Haven as well as a loss of Democratic voters' support to Weicker. Late in the campaign, Democratic politicos looked at polls showing Morrison at 10%, thirty points behind Weicker, and braced for the worst.

Republican nominee John Rowland emerged by October as the viable challenger to Weicker, profiting mainly from Republicans' discontent with Weicker's liberal tendencies (in the Senate, he was by far the most liberal Republican and, by some measures, more liberal even than Democrat Chris Dodd) and hoping that Connecticut's large Democratic electorate would split their votes between Morrison and Weicker. Discontent with Weicker's tacit support of the broad-based income tax proved to be Rowland's campaign centerpiece. His stand against the tax appealed to the wealthy suburban class of Fairfield County, negating any personal vote Weicker may have had there. When it appeared that Rowland was gaining on Weicker in the final days of the campaign, the Republicans opened up their final broadside, accusing the former Senator of insider trading. However, going into election day, every poll showed Weicker with a considerable lead.

Results
Weicker won a plurality of the vote, 40%. Rowland managed a surprisingly strong 37%, and the Democrats narrowly avoided disaster when Morrison won just over 20%. (Had he failed to, the Democratic Party would have lost official party status and would have been forced to petition its way onto every ballot until at least 1994.)  Morrison won just three towns, all with the word "Haven" in their names. His strong personal vote in the New Haven area fell off dramatically elsewhere in the state, and his winning of a mere 38% in Hartford still rates as the worst performance for a Democrat in the capital city for more than a century. All the Democratic strongholds - Bloomfield, New London, Mansfield, New Britain - swung to Weicker's column.

Weicker's triumph could be attributed to a strong choice of running mate - lawyer Eunice Groark of Hartford - who bore the name of one of Hartford's founding families. The margins that Groark boosted in the Hartford area could certainly be said to have put Weicker over the top. Weicker won the traditionally Republican towns that were not as wealthy as some of the GOP's gold-plated Fairfield County redoubts and supposedly had less to lose from the implementation of an income tax. Towns like Woodstock, Eastford, Somers and Hartland all had large Republican votes for Weicker. Republican loyalty to Rowland, conversely, came in the wealthiest towns of the Gold Coast as well as culturally conservative and heavily Catholic locales in the Naugatuck Valley repelled by Weicker's liberal politics. The once solidly Republican Farmington Valley, additionally, began to turn away from GOP control. The process of the maturation of its suburbs from the denizens of the wealthy living in quaint pastoral surroundings into thoroughly middle-class commuter towns home increasingly to low-level service and governmental employees, as prefigured by "streetcar suburb" West Hartford, began to transform the towns into moderately liberal, cultural satellites of Hartford.

References
 

Gubernatorial
1990
Connecticut